Sidi al-Mukhtar ibn Ahmad al-Kunti (1729-1811) was a leading ʻalim of the Qadiriyya movement in the Western Sudan who played an important role in promoting the spread of Islam in West Africa in the nineteenth century.

Origins

Al-Mukhtar ibn Ahmad al-Kunti was born in 1729 in the Erg Oralla region to the north of Mabroûk, Mali. 
His family belonged to the Zawāyā, a group of tribes that had abandoned violence and self-defense in favor of a peaceful life of religious devotions and herding, paying tribute to the warrior groups to avoid molestation.
He was a member of the influential Kunta clerical tribe, originally Saharan Berbers from southern Morocco (region around Akka) who had acted as spokesmen for their fellow Berbers in dealings with the Beni Ḥassān Arabs. Many of the Kunta moved east to the region north of Timbuktu and became salt merchants.  The Kunta adopted the teachings of Muhammad al-Maghili, a noted cleric around 1500 CE who was said to have introduced the Qadiriyya order of Sufis to the region.

Al-Mukhtar's father died when he was ten.
Other members of his family assisted in his education, as did members of the Kel al-Suq and Kel Hurma families.
His main teacher was Shaykh Sidi Ali bin al-Najib of Araouane, a leading Qadiriyya cleric. 
For a period he was caretaker of the tomb near Oualata of Sidi Ahmad al-Kunti (aka al-Bakka'i Bu Dam'a), a Kunta saint who had died in 1515.
Between 1754 and 1757 he studied in Morocco. He married a distant cousin on his return.

Career

Al-Mukhtar succeeded Sidi Ali as Shaykh when he died.
From Azawad he mediated in tribal disputes, particularly between the Kunta and the Barabish.
Al-Mukhtar al-Kunti had outstanding leadership abilities in addition to his scholarship and spiritual qualities.  Starting in 1757, already recognized as the leader of the Kunta and soon by all the other Qadiri shaykhs, he became increasingly involved in resolving disputes among the Tuareg people of the region.

Eventually al-Mukhtar came to be the recognized spiritual leader in a large region around the bend of the Niger River.
In this area the Iwellemmedan people were the dominant warriors and the Kunta dominated trade as well as providing religious leadership.

He gave spiritual advice to the Ullimiden tribal chief Kawa Ag Amma.

He died at the age of 82 in 1226 AH (1811 CE) and was succeeded by his son Muhammad and then his grandson Ahmad al-Bakkay.

Influence
Al-Mukhtar al-Kunti was a prolific author, said to have written three hundred treatises on aspects of Islam and its practices.

He saw himself as a mujaddid, and thought that he was inspired by the Prophet, who had appeared to him and said "you are the true messenger to renovate my Way."  In his writings he is strongly opposed to such things as charms and amulets, and to the growing numbers of mallams primarily interested in money.

Al-Mukhtar al-Kunti strongly believed that a shaykh should lead by example, following a pure asceticism informed by Islamic truth.
He corresponded widely with other scholars in the arid and semi-arid lands that extend from the Kanem–Bornu Empire in the east to the Atlantic coast.

Al-Mukhtar's huge moral influence and support for the Qadiriyya tariqa meant that Islam expanded its role in the region beyond that of the private religion of merchants and scholars. The tariqa members were required to spread the message among the pagans of one God to whom all men were subordinate. Mukhtar al-Kunti trained clerics so they could establish Islamic schools in the pagan countries, and these schools could in turn spread the word further.

In response to a question on the status of the Fula people, Sidi al-Mukhtar explicitly refused to acknowledge any difference between blacks and whites.

Al-Mukhtar's pupil Shaykh Sīdyā al-Kabīr was an influential Qadiriyya cleric in Mauritania. In the Ségou Empire, his pupil Bakari was assassinated because he was unwilling to compromise with paganism.

Al-Mukhtar taught both Usman dan Fodio and Seku Amadu of the Massina Empire.

Usman dan Fodio looked up to al-Mukhtar as a teacher, and al-Mukhtar reportedly threw his support behind Usman in the campaign in which he founded the Sokoto Caliphate in 1809, saying "Usman ibn Fudi is one of the accomplished saints; his jihad is just."

Notes and references
Notes

Citations

Sources

 

1729 births
1811 deaths
Malian Sufis
History of Mali
People of French West Africa
19th-century African people
19th-century Islam
Muslim reformers
Arabic-language writers
People from Timbuktu